Robert Leask (born June 9, 1971) is a Canadian-German ice hockey coach and former professional ice hockey defenceman who played primarily in the Deutsche Eishockey Liga. Born in North York, Ontario, Leask was granted German citizenship in 2004.

Playing career
Leask was drafted 209th overall in the 1991 NHL Entry Draft by the Washington Capitals. He started his professional career with the Baltimore Skipjacks of the AHL in 1992. As a member of the Johnstown Chiefs, Leask was named to the ECHL All-Star Team in 1994 and 1995.

Leask spent the 1995-96 playing for the Canadian National Team. Later in his career, he represented the German National Team, participating in the 2004 and 2006 World Championships and the 2006 Olympic Games in Turin.

Leask played in the Deutsche Eishockey Liga (DEL) since 1996. As a member of Eisbären Berlin, Leask was named to the DEL All-Star Team in both 2004 and 2005 and was a member of the team when Eisbären Berlin won the DEL Championship in 2005 and 2006.

After three seasons with the Hamburg Freezers, Leask was signed as an injury replacement for the Nürnberg Ice Tigers on August 26, 2009. On March 10, 2010, Leask signed an extension with the Ice Tigers. He finished his playing career at the end of the 2012-13 season.

Coaching career
Leask began his coaching career at German Oberliga side EV Regensburg, being appointed head coach of the Regensburg team on May 31, 2013. After being sacked by Regensburg in February 2014 he served as an assistant coach at the EC Kassel Huskies in the DEL2, the second-tier league in Germany, during the 2014-15 campaign.
In April 2015, Leask was named assistant coach of the Straubing Tigers, a member of the German top-tier league Deutsche Eishockey Liga.

Career statistics

Regular season and playoffs

International

Awards and honours
Played in ECHL All-Star Game in 1994 and 1995
Played in DEL All-Star Game in 1998, 
2004 and 2005
DEL Champion in 2005 and 2006 (Eisbären Berlin)

References

External links

1971 births
Baltimore Skipjacks players
Canadian ice hockey defencemen
Eisbären Berlin players
Guelph Storm players
Hamburg Freezers players
Hamilton Dukes players
Hershey Bears players
Sportspeople from North York
Ice hockey people from Toronto
Johnstown Chiefs players
Living people
Oshawa Generals players
Portland Pirates players
Thomas Sabo Ice Tigers players
Toronto Marlboros players
Washington Capitals draft picks
Olympic ice hockey players of Germany
Ice hockey players at the 2006 Winter Olympics
Canadian expatriate ice hockey players in Germany
Canadian expatriate ice hockey players in the United States